Léoville is a commune in the Charente-Maritime department in southwestern France.

Geography
The village lies in the middle of the commune, on the left bank of the Lariat, a stream tributary of the Seugne, which forms all of the commune's western border.

Population

See also
 Communes of the Charente-Maritime department

References

External links
 

Communes of Charente-Maritime
Charente-Maritime communes articles needing translation from French Wikipedia